The Lemonheads is the eighth studio album by the Lemonheads and the first after their return from a nine-year hiatus.

Background
On April 26, 2006, it was announced that the Lemonheads had signed to Vagrant Records.  The group's new lineup consisted of original member Evan Dando and Descendents/All bassist Karl Alvarez and drummer Bill Stevenson. It was also revealed that the band was working on an album due for release later in the year. 

The Lemonheads features contributions from Josh Lattanzi on bass, the Band's Garth Hudson  on keyboards, and Dinosaur Jr.'s J Mascis on lead guitar. "Steve's Boy" is dedicated to William A. Stevenson, Bill Stevenson's father.

Release
On July 6, 2006, The Lemonheads was announced for release, and the track listing was revealed; later that month, the band played a few shows in the UK. On August 22, 2006, "No Backbone" was posted online. The Lemonheads was made available for streaming on September 25, 2006, and was released a day later. In November and December 2006, the band went on a tour of the U.S. In January and February 2007, they toured the US again; they then embarked on a tour of New Zealand and Australia in March and April 2007. In July 2007, the band toured the US East Coast with support from the Icarus Line.

A limited-edition yellow vinyl version of the album was released in 2008, with signed copies made available via the Lemonheads' website.

Track listing
All songs by Evan Dando unless otherwise stated.

 "Black Gown" - 2:04
 "Become the Enemy" (Bill Stevenson) - 3:54
 "Pittsburgh" - 2:55
 "Let's Just Laugh" (Dando, Stevenson) - 4:44
 "Poughkeepsie" - 2:10
 "Rule of Three" - 2:19
 "No Backbone" (Tom Morgan) - 3:07
 "Baby's Home" (Morgan; intro by Dando) - 3:31
 "In Passing" - 2:50
 "Steve's Boy" (Stevenson) - 2:44
 "December" - 4:22

Charts

References

The Lemonheads albums
2006 albums
Albums produced by Bill Stevenson (musician)